John Herring may refer to:
 John Herring (athlete), British athlete
 John Frederick Herring Sr., English painter, sign maker and coachman 
 John Frederick Herring Jr., his son, English painter
 John Mack Herring, who killed Betty Williams in a 1960s homicide case, see Kiss and Kill